José Luis Borja Alarcón (born May 29, 1947 in Cabezo de Torres-Murcia, Spain) is a former Spanish professional footballer.

He spent his career as a goalkeeper.

Club career

References
 
 madridista.hu

Real Madrid CF players
RCD Espanyol footballers
Spanish footballers
Living people
1947 births
Association football goalkeepers
Footballers from the Region of Murcia
Catalonia international guest footballers
La Liga players
Real Murcia players
Segunda División players